Marc B. Nathanson (born May 12, 1945) is an American entrepreneur who has served as the United States ambassador to Norway since 2022. He is best known for his founding of Falcon Cable, which he sold in 1999 for $3.7 billion. He is a member of the Cable TV Hall of Fame, awarded with Inc.s Entrepreneur of the Year and a former chairman of the Broadcasting Board of Governors. In 2008, his net worth was listed as $1.1 billion by Forbes Magazine in their annual The World's Billionaires listing; as of 2021, he no longer made the list.

Early life and education
Nathanson was born in Los Angeles and raised in Glencoe, Illinois and Highland Park, Illinois. His father, Don Paul "D.P." Nathanson was an investor in the radio and cable industry, operated an advertising agency, and was the publisher of Radio Showmanship, a magazine that focused on how to use radio for advertising. His great uncle was Nathan Nathanson, the founder of Famous Players, a Canadian-based film exhibitor and cable television service provider. Nathanson graduated from Highland Park High School and graduated from the University of Denver in 1967. In 1969, he earned a Master of Arts in political science from the University of California, Santa Barbara.

Career
His first job was as a door-to-door salesman selling cable to people in their homes. In 1969, he took a job with Cypress Communications Corporation (owned by Harriscope Broadcasting) in Los Angeles, California, where he became head of marketing (Cypress was eventually sold to Warner Cable in 1973).

After Cypress Communications, Nathanson became vice-president of marketing and programming for TelePrompTer Corporation. In 1973, he left to start his own firm, Falcon Cable, with a self-investment of $25,000. He received a $2 million investment from his father and father-in-law, and $6 million from a bank loan. The first cable systems he ran were in Gilroy, Porterville. Altadena, and San Luis Obispo, California. The umbrella corporation for the cable company and Nathanson's other ventures was Falcon Holding Group, which Nathanson served as president for until 1999. The corporation included Falcon International Communications and Falcon International. He also served as the company's CEO from 1975 until its sale in 1999. From 1988 to 1999 he also served as chief executive officer and president of Enstar Communications Corp, and as chairman of the board for each of the companies.

According to the Los Angeles Times, "while many larger cable TV companies have scrambled to wire major metropolitan areas with flashy, 75-channel, state-of-the-art cable TV systems, Falcon has found success in operating no-frills systems in areas that get poor TV reception."

The Falcon Group formed in 1984 with Nathanson co-owner of the cable company. According to the Los Angeles Times, the company was formed with other co-owners, including the Mutual Life Insurance of New York, following a $50 million deal for 18 cable systems in seven states that were owned jointly by Warner Communications and American Express. Nathanson was a part of larger mergers between cable entities during the 1990s as well. In 1998 Tele-Communications Inc. took a 47 percent stake in Falcon, and the following year the company was sold to Paul Allen's Charter Communications for $3.7 (initial reports pegged the price closer to $3.6 billion). The deal provided Nathanson with the second largest stock holding among the Charter shareholders. According to the St. Louis Business Journal, the deal made "Charter the fourth-largest cable TV operator in the country, with 5.5 million customers." In 1994, he was Inc. Magazine'''s Entrepreneur of the Year.

Nathanson invested the profits from the sale into his investment firms Mapleton Investments and Mapleton/RDS Real Estate Group, which has investments in industries ranging from radio to real estate to waterless urinal companies with Falcon Waterfree Technologies, which he first invested with in 2000. He is currently Chairman of each firm. Falcon Waterfree Technologies is the largest manufacturer of waterless urinals in the world.

Nathanson became vice-chairman of Charter Communications upon the sale of Falcon and a director of the board, until 2008. He also served as director of the National Cable & Telecommunications Association and a trustee of the Aspen Institute. He had also previously served as president of the California Cable Television Association, as a member of Cable Pioneers, and founded both the Cable Television Administration and Marketing Society (CTAM) and the Southern California Cable Television Association. In addition he is co-chair of the Pacific Council on International Policy, a member of the Council on Foreign Relations, the World Affairs Council, and several charity boards in Southern California. He is also a member of the board of directors for the Los Angeles Philharmonic.

Politics
President Bill Clinton appointed Nathanson to a three-year term on the board of governors of international broadcasting of the United States Information Agency in 1998. He served as chairman of the Broadcasting Board of Governors during the Clinton and Bush administrations, is a member of the American Democracy Institute, the U.S. Institute of Peace's International Advisory Council, and the USC Annenberg School for Communication and Journalism. His tenure as chairman of the Broadcasting Board of Governors lasted from 1995 to 2002 and included leading the Broadcasting Board of Governors through its international response to the September 11 attacks.

In 2012, Secretary of State Hillary Clinton named Nathanson as her representative to the board of the East–West Center in Honolulu, Hawaii. He is also the vice-chair of the National Democratic Institute for International Affairs and was founding chair of the Homeland Security Advisory Council for Los Angeles." Nathanson was an early supporter of Barack Obama during his 2008 presidential nomination campaign.

Ambassador to Norway
On October 29, 2021, President Joe Biden nominated Nathanson to be the US Ambassador to Norway. Hearings on his nomination were held before the Senate Foreign Relations Committee on April 7, 2022. The committee favorably reported his nomination to the Senate floor on May 4, 2022. The entire Senate confirmed Nathanson via voice vote on May 5, 2022. He presented his credentials to King Harald V on June 16, 2022.

Philanthropy
Nathanson bequeathed the endowment for the Marc Nathanson Fellowship program at the University of Denver, Nathanson's alma mater; it provides an award to a   second-year MA student at the Josef Korbel School of International Studies He also endowed an award known as Nathanson Fellowship at USC.

Following a $10 million donation of art to the Los Angeles County Museum of Art, the museum named a gallery for he and his wife. He has also served as a trustee for the UCLA Foundation and UCLA Anderson School of Management   and USC Annenberg School of Communication. In 2006 they also financed the purchase of a series of prints by Edward Ruscha for LACMA. He has also been a patron and sponsor for exhibitions at the Museum of Contemporary Art, Los Angeles.

The Jane and Marc Nathanson Family Foundation invests charitably and sponsors scientific studies into environmental problems like water shortages and usage efficiency. They are also known for being early supporters of AIDS victims during the early years of the epidemic. At UCLA an endowment produced their namesake Jane and Marc Nathanson Family Professor in Psychiatry chair.

On January 20, 2015, LACMA received eight pieces of modern and contemporary art from Nathanson and his wife, Jane (who is also a LACMA trustee and a founder and trustee of the Museum of Contemporary Art, Los Angeles); the gift was estimated at over $50 million. The works include Andy Warhol's Two Marilyns silkscreen, James Rosenquist's Portrait of the Scull Family, George Segal's Laundromat, Gilbert and George's Falling, Frank Stella's La Columba Ladra, Julian Schnabel's Fox Farm Painting X, Roy Lichtenstein's Interior with Three Hanging Lamps, Damien Hirst's And Death Will Have His Day and 10 gelatin silver prints.

Recognition
Nathanson is a member of the Cable TV Hall of Fame and in 1994 he was Inc. Magazine'''s Entrepreneur of the Year. According to the Milken Institute, "Nathanson is a recipient of Global Green's Millennium Award and the Environmental Media Association's Lifetime Achievement Award for his environmental work."

Personal life
In 1967, Nathanson married Jane Falleck, a psychologist and philanthropist, whom he met in college. They have two sons, Adam and David, and a daughter, Nicole. Adam is married to actor Lauren Waisbren in 2010 and is the founder of radio station owner and operator Mapleton Communications. David is head of business development for Fox Sports and is married to Sabina Spigel.

References

External links

1945 births
Living people
21st-century American diplomats
Ambassadors of the United States to Norway
American art collectors
American billionaires
American company founders
American telecommunications industry businesspeople
American marketing businesspeople
American technology chief executives
Businesspeople from Chicago
Businesspeople from Los Angeles
Clinton administration personnel
George W. Bush administration personnel
Jewish American philanthropists
Philanthropists from Illinois
University of California, Santa Barbara alumni
University of Denver alumni